A list of films produced in Italy in 2008 (see 2008 in film):

External links
Italian films of 2008 at the Internet Movie Database

2008
Films
Italian